Rhopobota orbiculata is a species of moth of the family Tortricidae. It is found in Gansu, China.

The wingspan is 16–19 mm. The ground colour of the forewings is grey. The hindwings are dark grey.

Etymology
The species name refers to the early rounded ocellar area of the forewings and is derived from Latin orbiculatus (meaning circular).

References

Moths described in 2005
Eucosmini